This is a list of National Basketball Association general managers.

List

See also 

 NBA Executive of the Year Award
 List of National Basketball Association head coaches
 List of National Basketball Association team presidents
 List of NBA team owners

References